Samar Dubhashi (born 22 September 1995) is an Indian cricketer. He made his first-class debut for Goa in the 2014–15 Ranji Trophy on 6 February 2015. He made his List A debut on 14 December 2021, for Goa in the 2021–22 Vijay Hazare Trophy.

References

External links
 

1995 births
Living people
Indian cricketers
Goa cricketers
Place of birth missing (living people)
Wicket-keepers